"Killing Children" is a short story by Orson Scott Card.  It appears in his short story collections Capitol and The Worthing Saga.  Card first published it in the November 1978 issue of Analog Science Fiction and Fact.

Plot summary
Linkeree Danol thinks he is in psychiatric hospital for murdering his mother.  However, when his mother shows up to visit him, he starts acting like a five-year-old boy and runs away from the hospital.  While outside, he goes onto the plains of his world and finds an abandoned baby.  Since he can do nothing to help the baby, he leaves it where he found it and is later found by the primitive tribe that abandoned the baby.  The next day, the tribe goes back to the baby and eats it.  Linkeree sees this and decides that it was his past they are cutting up and eating and is cured of his insanity.  He realizes that it was a young woman that he was dating whom he killed, but that his mother had driven him insane from years of psychological abuse.  When Linkeree returns to the hospital, he tells his doctor that if he goes back to live with his mother, he will go insane again.  His doctor agrees and helps him leave his world and go to the planet Capitol.

Connection to the Worthing Saga
This book uses several plot elements also used in The Worthing Saga, such as the sleeping drug Somec and the taping of memories.  Linkeree is one of the colonists that goes with Jason Worthing to found a new world in chapter 5 of Card’s novel The Worthing Chronicle.

See also

List of works by Orson Scott Card
Orson Scott Card

External links 
 
 The official Orson Scott Card website

Short stories by Orson Scott Card
1978 short stories
Works originally published in Analog Science Fiction and Fact